Drăgănești is a commune in Prahova County, Muntenia, Romania. It is composed of seven villages: Bărăitaru, Belciug, Cornu de Jos, Drăgănești, Hătcărău, Meri and Tufani.

References

Communes in Prahova County
Localities in Muntenia